Gananath Obeyesekere is Emeritus Professor of Anthropology at Princeton University and has done much work in his home country of Sri Lanka. His research focuses on psychoanalysis and anthropology and the ways in which personal symbolism is related to religious experience, in addition to the European voyages of discovery to Polynesia in the 18th century and after, and the implications of these voyages for the development of ethnography. His books include Land Tenure in Village Ceylon, Medusa's Hair, The Cult of the Goddess Pattini, Buddhism Transformed (coauthor), The Work of Culture, The Apotheosis of Captain Cook: European Mythmaking in the Pacific, and Making Karma.

Career
Professor Obeyesekere completed a B.A. in English (1955) at the University of Ceylon, Peradeniya, followed by an M.A. (1958) and Ph.D (1964) at the University of Washington. Before his appointment to Princeton, Obeyesekere held teaching positions at the University of Ceylon, the University of Washington and the University of California, San Diego. He was Chair of the Princeton University Anthropology Department and a Professor from 1980 to the year 2000 when he retired. He has received several academic awards, the most recent being the Thomas H. Huxley medal by the Royal Anthropological Institute in recognition of his scholarly contributions to the discipline.

Debate with Sahlins
In the 1990s he entered into a well-known intellectual debate with Marshall Sahlins over the rationality of indigenous peoples. The debate was carried out through an examination of the details of Captain James Cook's death in the Hawaiian Islands in 1779. At the heart of the debate was how to understand the rationality of indigenous people. Obeyesekere insisted that indigenous people thought in essentially the same way as Westerners and was concerned that any argument otherwise would paint them as "irrational" and "uncivilized". In contrast Sahlins argued that each culture may have different types of rationality that make sense of the world by focusing on different patterns and explain them within specific cultural narratives, and that assuming that all cultures lead to a single rational view is a form of eurocentrism.

Books
Land Tenure In Village Ceylon : A Sociological And Historical Study, 1967
Medusa's Hair : An Essay On Personal Symbols And Religious Experience, 1981
The Cult Of The Goddess Pattini, 1984
Buddhism Transformed: Religious Change in Sri Lanka (with Richard Gombrich), 1988
The Work Of Culture : Symbolic Transformation In Psychoanalysis And Anthropology, 1990
The Apotheosis Of Captain Cook : European Mythmaking In The Pacific, 1992
Imagining Karma: Ethical Transformation in Amerindian, Buddhist, and Greek Rebirth, 2002
Cannibal Talk : The Man-Eating Myth and Human Sacrifice in the South Seas, 2005
Karma and Rebirth, 2005
The Awakened Ones: Phenomenology of Visionary Experience, 2012
The Doomed King: A Requiem For Sri Vikrama Rajasinha, 2017
The Many Faces of the Kandyan Kingdom: 1591-1765, Lessons for our Time, 2020

Videos
Kataragama: A God For All Seasons, 1973 
Distributed by the Royal Anthropological Institute

References

External links
 Princeton faculty page
 Interview with Obeyesekere

Living people
University of Washington alumni
Psychological anthropologists
Anthropologists of religion
Sri Lankan anthropologists
Princeton University faculty
1930 births